Cribrilaria is a genus of bryozoans belonging to the family Cribrilinidae.

The genus has cosmopolitan distribution.

Species:

Cribrilaria antoniettae 
Cribrilaria arrecta 
Cribrilaria bathyalis 
Cribrilaria bifida 
Cribrilaria californiensis 
Cribrilaria cassidainsis 
Cribrilaria crenatimargo 
Cribrilaria denticulata 
Cribrilaria harmelini 
Cribrilaria harmeri 
Cribrilaria haueri 
Cribrilaria hexaspinosa 
Cribrilaria hincksii 
Cribrilaria innominata 
Cribrilaria kollmanni 
Cribrilaria lagaaiji 
Cribrilaria larwoodi 
Cribrilaria lateralis 
Cribrilaria mikelae 
Cribrilaria minima 
Cribrilaria multicostata 
Cribrilaria nixor 
Cribrilaria octospinosa 
Cribrilaria parisiensis 
Cribrilaria parva 
Cribrilaria paschalis 
Cribrilaria perplexa 
Cribrilaria picardi 
Cribrilaria profunda 
Cribrilaria pseudoradiata 
Cribrilaria radiata 
Cribrilaria rarecostata 
Cribrilaria reflexa 
Cribrilaria saginata 
Cribrilaria saldanhai 
Cribrilaria setiformis 
Cribrilaria smitti 
Cribrilaria taylori 
Cribrilaria variabilis 
Cribrilaria venusta

References

Bryozoan genera